The Order of St. Catherine the Great Martyr, is a State decoration of Russia established on 3 May 2012.  President Dmitry Medvedev issued a presidential decree establishing an Order of St. Catherine to honour Russians and foreigners for outstanding contributions toward peacekeeping, charity, humanitarian efforts, and the preservation of cultural heritage.

References

Civil awards and decorations of Russia
Awards established in 2012

nl:Orde van Sint-Catharina